This is a list of Honduran departments by Human Development Index as of 2021.

See also

References 

Honduras
Human Development Index
Departments